is a Japanese manga series written and illustrated by Keiji Najima. It was serialized in Kodansha's shōnen manga magazine Weekly Shōnen Magazine from January 2009 to May 2014, with its chapters collected in 11 tankōbon volumes. A 13-episode anime television series adaptation produced by Tatsunoko Production was broadcast from April to June 2013.

Plot
Takurō Mukōjima is a boy angler. He lands a ningyo (Japanese mermaid) by the name of Muromi-san and develops rapport with both her and her friends. The series title in English is Muromi-san and the Legendary Beasts. Muromi physically appears as a 16-year-old, however in reality, she is an ancient legendary creature. Muromi and her sisters are both guardians of the Earth and much older than they appear. "Takkun", as Muromi calls him, is a high school student who does not have a lot of motivation or care for all the attention Muromi gives him, yet he still ends up getting involved in Muromi's adventures. There are a number of legendary monsters Takkun meets and almost gets eaten by during their adventures.

Characters

A cheerful mermaid who speaks Hakata dialect. She often goes ashore and enjoys human culture. Somehow she feels kindly toward Takurō.

A high school student who likes fishing. He has a cool head and does not panic even when he faced strange creatures. He is called Takkun by Muromi.

An innocent mermaid who also speaks Hakata dialect. She calls Muromi "." Loves animals, and is good friends especially with dolphins.

 Muromi's drinking companion mermaid with a ponytail. She is often unlucky in love and drinks in desperation.

 A high-handed mermaid who has huge breasts. Later, she awakes to love for Muromi, although Muromi does not feel the same way, and later becomes a masochist.

Muromi's senpai mermaid who speaks Kokura dialect. She was once a fierce monster, but was reformed by Muromi and is generous now.

A cryptid in Himalayas. Unlike the general reputation, it is cute, quiet and diligent. It is shy, but is friends with Muromi. It hates being pulled by its ears.

A childish, forgetful bird-girl who lives with and takes on Yeti and often pounces on mermaids. She also has a really short memory, forgetting everything important after walking three steps.

An owner of the Ryūgū-jō, a legendary undersea palace. However, the Ryugu-jo went bankrupt and she is reduced to a part-time worker in human world now.

A Kappa friend of Muromi. Like other kappa, he is skilled in medicine and raising cucumbers. He dislikes humans because they killed his older brother (his mummy is the one in the Zuiryū-ji temple in Osaka) but takes a liking to Takurō.

Media

Manga
Written and illustrated by Keiji Najima, Muromi-san was first published as a short-term intensive serialization in Kodansha's shōnen manga magazine Weekly Shōnen Magazine from January 21 to February 18, 2009; it was later developed into a full series starting on July 15, 2009, and finished on May 28, 2014. Kodansha collected its chapters in 11 tankōbon volumes, released from February 17, 2010, to July 17, 2014.

Najima posted a series of  chapters on Twitter from September 1, 2019, to August 8, 2020; they were collected in a single volume released on December 17 of the same year, and a special eigth-page one-shot chapter was published in Weekly Shōnen Magazine on the same day.

Volume list

Anime
A 13-episode anime television series, produced by Tatsunoko Production, directed by Tatsuya Yoshihara and written by Kazuyuki Fudeyasu, was broadcast on Tokyo MX, MBS, TVK, TV Aichi, TVQ and BS11 from April 7 to June 30, 2013. An orginal animation DVD (OAD) was bundled with the limited edition of the manga's ninth volume, released on August 16, 2013.

The series was streamed by Crunchyroll.

Episode list

Notes

References

External links
 Manga official website 
 Anime official website 
 

2013 anime television series debuts
Anime series based on manga
Comedy anime and manga
Kodansha manga
Mermaids in popular culture
Shōnen manga
Tatsunoko Production